Zera Pulsipher (also Zerah) (June 24, 1789 – January 1, 1872) was a First Seven Presidents of the Seventy of the Church of Jesus Christ of Latter-day Saints (LDS Church). In that capacity, he provided leadership to the early Mormon community, most notably in the exodus of a large group of Saints from Kirtland, Ohio. He was also an active missionary who baptized Wilford Woodruff into the LDS Church.

Ancestry and youth
Pulsipher was born in Rockingham, Vermont, to John and Elizabeth Pulsipher. He came from a heritage of New England settlers and patriots, including a father and grandfather who fought in the Battle of Bunker Hill. He spent much of his childhood working on his parents’ farm. During his early twenties, Pulsipher attempted to study to become a doctor, but decided to return to farming. He married Mary Randall in 1810 and they had a daughter together. Mary died after a year of being married. Pulsipher married Mary Brown a few years later and they raised a large family together.

Religious experience 
The Pulsipher family was introduced to the Latter Day Saint church while living in Onondaga County, New York, and Pulsipher was baptized on January 11, 1832, by missionary Jared Carter. For the next two years, Pulsipher presided over the branch of the church in that county and served a number of missions to preach his new-found faith. During one of these missions he taught and baptized future LDS Church president Wilford Woodruff. In 1835, the Pulsiphers moved to church headquarters at Kirtland, Ohio, where Pulsipher was ordained as a First President of the Seventy on March 6, 1838, replacing Salmon Gee, who had been released. After the highest leadership of the church fled Kirtland in 1838, Pulsipher and the other First Presidents of the Seventy organized the bulk of the remaining adherents to travel to Far West, Missouri, the new church headquarters. This group of over 500 Latter Day Saints was known as the Kirtland Camp and was one of the earliest concerted efforts of mass Mormon migration.

Pulsipher and his family followed the main body of the church membership as they settled in Far West, Nauvoo, Winter Quarters, and Salt Lake City. He also helped settle Southern Utah in his later years. In each of these areas, Pulsipher provided leadership including helping to locate the settlement of Garden Grove, Iowa; leading a company of 100 to Utah; serving as a city counselor in Salt Lake City for a number of years; and presiding over the settlement of Hebron, Utah, from 1863 to 1869.

Pulsipher misused the sealing authority by performing two unauthorized polygamous marriages for William Bailey during the years 1856 and 1861, and was brought to answer before the First Presidency on April 12, 1862. At the meeting, Pulsipher was instructed to be rebaptized, released as one of the Seven Presidents of the Seventy, and was given the option to be ordained a high priest. Pulsipher was later ordained a patriarch, and died in Hebron, Utah, in early 1872 as a member in full fellowship in the church.

Family
Pulsipher married four wives over the course of his life and had 17 children:
Mary or Polly Randall (1789–1812), married November 6, 1810. One child: Harriet Pulsipher.
Mary Brown (1799–1886), married August 1815. Eleven children: Mary Ann, Almira, Nelson, Mariah, Sarah, John, Charles, Mary Ann, William M., Eliza Jane, and Fidelia.
Prudence McNanamy (1803–1883), married July 12, 1854. No known children.
Martha Hughes (1843–1907), married March 18, 1857. Five children: Martha Ann, Mary Elizabeth, Zerah James, Sarah Jane, and Andrew Milton.

References

External links

http://www.johnpratt.com/gen/8/7.z_pulsipher.html
http://www.johnpratt.com/gen/8/z_pulsipher.html
Zera Pulsipher Papers at the Church History Library in Salt Lake City

1789 births
1872 deaths
19th-century Mormon missionaries
American Mormon missionaries in the United States
American general authorities (LDS Church)
Angelic visionaries
Latter Day Saints from New York (state)
Latter Day Saints from Ohio
Latter Day Saints from Utah
Leaders in the Church of Christ (Latter Day Saints)
People from Rockingham, Vermont
People from Washington County, Utah
Presidents of the Seventy (LDS Church)
Religious leaders from Vermont